Vanak-e Olya (also Romanized as Vanak-e ‘Olyā; also known as Vanak-e Bālā) is a village in Chenarud-e Shomali Rural District, Chenarud District, Chadegan County, Isfahan Province, Iran. At the 2006 census, its population was 63, in 13 families.

References 

Populated places in Chadegan County